John Manzie (born 8 December 1947) is a former Australian rules footballer who played with St Kilda in the Victorian Football League (VFL) during the late 1960s and early 1970s.

As part of a strong St Kilda outfit, Manzie participated in nine finals, including the losing 1971 VFL Grand Final. He was used mainly as a wingman at St Kilda and retired after the 1975 season.

References

Holmesby, Russell and Main, Jim (2007). The Encyclopedia of AFL Footballers. 7th ed. Melbourne: Bas Publishing.

1947 births
Living people
Australian rules footballers from Victoria (Australia)
St Kilda Football Club players